Omar Jamal Salim Magoola (born 27 May 1995), commonly known as Jamal Salim, is a Ugandan footballer, who plays for Richards bay fc http://mtnfootball.com/news/464465/Magoolas-El-Merreikh-close-gap-in-Sudan-League|title= Magoola's El Merreikh close gap in Sudan League|work= FUFA|date= 2013-07-31|accessdate= 2014-02-17|archive-url= https://web.archive.org/web/20141001140020/http://mtnfootball.com/news/464465/Magoolas-El-Merreikh-close-gap-in-Sudan-League|archive-date= 2014-10-01|url-status= dead}}</ref>

Career
Salim has played club football in Uganda for Express FC and the Kampala Capital City Authority FC.

He was signed by Express FC after the Inter regions tournament in 2011, which was won by his team Central. In 2012, he was attending Kampala University as a first year student undertaking a degree in human resource management and was one of the nominees for Bell Super League goalkeeper of the year. He made his international debut for Uganda on 10 July 2012 against South Sudan.  He was a member of the Ugandan Cranes Team for two African Cap of Nations (AFCON) Finals in 2017 in Gabon and 2019 in Egypt.

Career statistics

International

References

1995 births
Living people
Ugandan footballers
Uganda international footballers
Kampala Capital City Authority FC players
Express FC players
Uganda Premier League players
Sudan Premier League players
Al-Merrikh SC players
Al-Hilal Club (Omdurman) players
2017 Africa Cup of Nations players
2019 Africa Cup of Nations players
Association football goalkeepers
Sportspeople from Kampala